William Albert Lewis (23  November 1921 – 27 August 1998) was a professional footballer for Blackpool and, notably, Norwich City F.C.

For Norwich, Lewis played from 1949–1954, making 256 appearances and scoring one goal.

After he retired from playing, he became a coach and reserve team trainer for Norwich.

He was elected to the Norwich City F.C. Hall of Fame in 2003.

References

Norwich City F.C. players
Norwich City F.C. non-playing staff
Blackpool F.C. players
1921 births
1998 deaths
Association football defenders
Place of birth missing
English footballers